Campanile auvertianum is a species of fossil sea snail, a marine gastropod mollusc in the family Campanilidae.

This species lived during the Eocene epoch, Bartonian age (from 38.0 to 41.3 Ma).

References

External links
 Museum Nationale d’histoire Naturelle

Campanilidae
Eocene gastropods
Paleogene gastropods of Europe
Paleogene gastropods of North America
Fossil taxa described in 1850